Vaive is a surname. Notable people with the surname include:

Claire Vaive (born 1940), Canadian politician
Justin Vaive (born 1989), American ice hockey player
Rick Vaive (born 1959), Canadian ice hockey player

See also
Vaive parish, parish of Cēsis District, Latvia